Norman Wesley Locking (May 24, 1911 – May 15, 1995) was a National Hockey League left winger. Born in Owen Sound, Ontario, he played in 52 career games in the NHL all of which were with the Chicago Black Hawks.

External links

Norm Locking's profile at Hockey Reference.com

1911 births
1995 deaths
Canadian ice hockey left wingers
Chicago Blackhawks players
Ice hockey people from Ontario
Sportspeople from Owen Sound
Pittsburgh Yellow Jackets (IHL) players